Alpu, also Alpıköy, is a town and district of Eskişehir Province in the Central Anatolia region of Turkey. According to 2010 census, population of the district is 12,768 of which 5,126 live in the town of Alpu.

Notes

References

External links
 District municipality's official website 
 Map of Alpu district

Towns in Turkey
Populated places in Eskişehir Province